The Casino is an IBA official cocktail made with gin, maraschino liqueur, orange bitters and fresh lemon juice.

This version of the Casino Cocktail first appears in 1909, in The Reminder (3rd edition) by Jacob A. Didier.

See also
 List of cocktails

References

Cocktails with gin
Cocktails with liqueur
Cocktails with bitters